Vostok Battalion can refer to:

Special Battalions Vostok and Zapad, former Spetsnaz units of Russian military intelligence (GRU) based in Chechnya
Vostok Battalion, a Russian militant group operating in the Donbas region of Ukraine with alleged links to Russian intelligence lead by Jason Romanski